The Capitol Years is an indie rock band founded by principal songwriter, Shai Halperin, (aka Shai, Son of Eli). Based in Philadelphia, Pennsylvania, Halperin has released 2 albums of solo work as "The Capitol Years" as well as 2 albums and an EP with a full band. 2010 saw a return to solo recording under the name Sweet Lights.

History
The Capitol Years debuted in July 2000 with a full-length album entitled Meet Yr Acres. Produced in Halperin's South Street studio apartment, Meet Yr Acres began as a series of self-engineered home recordings. With most vocals, guitars, and percussion captured on a digital 4-track, Halperin soon connected with producer Thom Monahan who transferred the project to a 1/2-inch analog tape 8-track machine at a home studio in Northampton, MA. Monahan, a former member/producer of The Pernice Brothers and future producer of records by Devendra Banhart, Vetiver, and others, helped Halperin flesh out the initially sparse tracks. The end result fell somewhere between the bedroom rock of Guided By Voices, the hushed melodies of George Harrison, and the lo-fi electro weirdness of Beck. The album also included a cover of The Velvet Underground's "All Tomorrow's Parties".

Originally distributed on cd-r under the "Shai, Son of Eli" moniker, Meet Yr Acres found a proper home with San Francisco's Full Frame Records and was officially released under the band name "The Capitol Years". It subsequently received positive marks from numerous press outlets including CMJ as well as Magnet magazine where it landed on the "Top 10 Hidden Treasures" list for 2001.

After recording Meet Yr Acres, Halperin recruited Dave Wayne Daniels on bass, Kyle Lloyd on drums, and after a year as a three piece, Jeff Van Newkirk on guitar and vocal harmonies. In 2005 the band welcomed Adam Granduciel on guitar after he briefly filled in on bass for Wayne Daniels during a Spring 2005 tour of the US. Granduciel has since gone on to form The War on Drugs. Other musicians known to have played one or more shows as a member of the band include Peter Rinko, songwriter and singer/guitarist for Enemy Love and Josh Newman.

Following the debut, The Capitol Years released the acoustic Pussyfootin and the full-band EP, Jewelry Store. National and local press attention increased and the band was named "Best of Philly" in 2003.

The Capitol Years have the distinction of opening the first reunion show on April 13, 2004 for The Pixies, a band who had not played together for 12 years.

The Capitol Years have toured the US multiple times as well as the UK, Spain, and Israel. Since 2001 the band has played with many notable contemporaries including The Walkmen, Daniel Johnston, The Kills, The Brian Jonestown Massacre, Dr. Dog, The Spinto Band, The Frogs, Lilys, Ted Leo, and Beachwood Sparks, as well as comedian David Cross.

In 2005, the band released Let Them Drink in the US and Spain.

On September 12, 2006, they released Dance Away The Terror on Park the Van Records which is also home to Dr. Dog and The High Strung. Pitchfork Media described the album as "the band's best full length yet" and, once more, Magnet magazine credited the band for delivering one of its Top 20 Albums Of The Year.

In early 2007, Halperin recorded a version of Daniel Johnston's "True Love Will Find You In The End". The song soon became a staple of the band's live set and appears in an online video featuring Shai, Son of Eli's cat, Yuri.

On February 22, 2008, the band supported and played as backing band for Daniel Johnston at the Trocadero Theater in Philadelphia. With The Capitol Years joining him on stage, Johnston performed the Beatles' "I'm So Tired" as well as John Lennon's "Isolation" for the first time in addition to many of his own classics. Four months later, the band resumed backing band duties with Johnston on a brief tour of the Northeast. The tour-mates added The Beatles' Help to the live repertoire. Backstage, Johnston and The Capitol Years were filmed in a piano based sing-a-long of more Beatles classics including "A Day in the Life", "For No One", "Cry Baby Cry", and Paul McCartney's "Too Many People".

In November 2008, the song "Revolutions" was voted "Single of the Week" on a popular BBC Radio 2 program airing in the UK.

Growing interest in the UK led to the release of a second single, "You Can Stay There", a tour of the country, and a performance at the Glastonbury Festival in June 2009. The tour also included a visit to the BBC and a performance/interview with one time Old Grey Whistle Test host Bob Harris.

In October 2009, The Capitol Years rejoined Daniel Johnston for a tour of the east coast and Canada.

In 2010, Halperin began writing and recording with the new name, Sweet Lights.

Discography
 2001 - Meet Yr Acres
 2003 - Pussyfootin
 2003 - Jewelry Store
 2004 - Ramona/Loretta Split 7 inch
 2005 - Let Them Drink
 2006 - Dance Away the Terror
 2010 - Sweet Lights - Sweet Lights

References

External links
 
 Sweet Lights tumblr
 Capitol Years Bandcamp
 Sweet Lights Bandcamp
 Capitol Years myspace

Indie rock musical groups from Pennsylvania
Musical groups from Philadelphia